

Universities
 Kerala Veterinary University, Pookode

Professional colleges
DM WIMS Medical College, Naseera Nagar, Meppadi
DM WIMS Nursing College, Naseera Nagar, Meppadi 
DM WIMS College of Pharmacy, Naseera Nagar, Meppadi
Government Engineering College, Wayanad, Mananthavady
Oriental School of Hotel Management, Lakkidi, Kalpetta
College of Veterinary and Animal Sciences, Pookode, Kalpetta
Oriental College of Hotel Management and Culinary Arts, Vythiri, Kalpetta
College of Dairy Science and Technology, Pookode, Kalpetta
Oriental Institute for Management Studies, Vythiri, Kalpetta
Centre for Computer Science and Information Technology of Calicut University, Muttil, Kalpetta
Centre for PG Studies in Social Work of Calicut University, Sultan Bathery
Government Polytechnic College, Meenangadi
Government Polytechnic College, Meppadi, Kalpetta
Government Polytechnic College, Dwaraka, Mananthavady
Vinayaka College of Nursing, Sultan Bathery
KMM Government ITI, Kalpetta
Government ITI for Women, Nenmeni, Sultan Bathery

Arts and Science Colleges 
St. Mary's College, Sultan Bathery
NMSM Government College, Kalpetta
WMO Arts & Science College, Muttil, Kalpetta
Government College, Mananthavady
Pazhassi Raja College, Pulpally
Mary Matha Arts & Science College, Mananthavady
Don Bosco College, Sultan Bathery
Green Mount Arts & Science College, Padinjarethara, Kalpetta
PM Charitable Trust, Arts & Science College, Meppadi, Kalpetta
SNDP Yogam Arts & Science College, Pulpally
Alphonsa Arts & Science College, Sultan Bathery
CM College of Arts and Science Nadavayal
WMO Arts & Science College, Koolivayal, Mananthavady
PKKM College of Applied Science (under IHRD), Mananthavady
Model College of Applied Science (under IHRD), Meenangadi
Jayasree Arts & Science College, Kalluvayal, Pulpally
St. Mary's College, Meenangadi

Schools

Federal Schools
 Kendriya Vidyalaya, Kalpetta
 Jawahar Navodaya Vidyalaya, Wayanad

Government Schools 
G H S S, Kakkavayal 	Kakkavayal
G H S S, Kartikulam 	Kartikulam
G H S S, Koleri 	Koleri
G H S S, Moolankavu 	Moolankavu
G H S S, Panamkandy 	Karani
G H S S, Thrissileri 	Thrissileri
G H S S, Vaduvanchal	Vaduvanchal
AMMR H S S, Nalloornadu 	Nalloornadu
G H S S, Cheeral 	Cheeral
G H S S, Kaniyambetta 	Kaniyambetta
G H S S, Meenangadi 	Meenangadi
G H S S, Meppadi 	Meppadi
G H S S, Padinjarathara 	Padinjarathara
G H S S, Panamaram 	Panamaram

G H S S Thalapuzha 	Thalapuzha
G H S S Thariode 	Thariode
G H S S Valad	Valad
G M H S S Vellamunda	Vellamunda
G H S Pariyaram Kalpetta

Govt. Vocational Higher Secondary Schools
G V H S S Ambalavayal 	Ambalavayal
G V H S S Kalpetta 	Kalpetta
G V H S S Mananthavadi 	Mananthavadi
G V H S S Sultan Bathery 	Sultan Bathery

Aided Higher Secondary Schools
 St. THOMAS HS NADAVAYAL (Estd in 1957)
Jayasree HSS Kalluvayal 	Kalanadikolly
Sacret Heart HSS Dwaraka 	Nalloornadu
SKMJ HSS Kalpetta 	Kalpetta
SN HSS Poothadi 	Poothadi
St. Catherine's HSS Payyampally 	Payyampally
St. Joseph's HSS Kallodi 	Edavaka
St. Joseph's HSS Meppadi 	Meppadi
St. Mary's College HSS Bathery 	Kuppadi
St. Mary's HSS Mullenkolly	Mullenkolly
Vijaya HSS Pulpally 	Pulpally
WO HSS Pinangode 	Vengapally

Aided Vocational Higher Secondary Schools
Devi Vilasam V H S S Veliyambam 	Veliyambam
WO V H S S Muttil 	Muttil

Unaided Higher Secondary Schools
De Paul Public School Kalpetta 
MGM EM HSS Mananthavay 	Mananthavady
NSS English Medium HSS Kalpetta 	Kalpetta
St. Peters & St. Pauls HSS Meenangadi 	Meenangadi
St. Joseph's Higher Secondary School, Sultan Bathery

References

 
Wayanad
Wayanad